Krishna Chandra Das (1869–1934), commonly referred to as K.C. Das, was a Bengali confectioner, entrepreneur, businessman and Bengali cultural icon of the early 20th century. Born in 1869 in Bag bazar, Kolkata, Krishna Chandra was the only son and successor of the Bengali confectioner and sweetmeat inventor Nobin Chandra Das. Krishna Chandra was a versatile enthusiast with a spirit of scientific exploration. He developed an electric loom, a soda fountain machine, did extensive research on homeopathy, and researched eastern and western classical music. Krishna Chandra Das became an iconic figure in the 1930s Kolkata with his original creation the "Rosso Malai" and the vacuum canned "Rosso Golla", which were popularized and promoted throughout India by his family organization K.C. Das Private Limited, founded by Krishna Chandra's son and successor Sarada Charan Das.

Historical background 
Nobin Chandra Das left his confectionery business to his only son Krishna Chandra Das. Krishna pioneered an exploratory spirit in the family confectionery business, enabling it to grow as a leading Indian confectioner.

Krishna Chandra, having an immense liking for scientific innovations and machinery, initially started a mechanical and scientific workshop at Bagbazar. His primary focus was developing new technology to modernize and revamp the Bengali sweet confectionery. Unfortunately his mother Khridmoni Devi vehemently opposed the idea of redefining Nobin Chandra Das’ confectionery in the light of science and experimentation. This drove Krishna Chandra (K.C.Das) to break out of his father's confectionery and create an original development as an extension to the family business under his own title. His vision to imbibe scientific methodology was soon realized and rewarded in terms of economic and technological success. It is probably largely due to the pioneering efforts of K.C. Das that the "Rossogolla" is widely regarded as the national sweet of India.

Life and family 
Besides being privileged to have the legendary "Nobin Moira" as his father, Krishna Chandra also inherited a well-known confectionery legacy from his mother's family. His mother, Khirod Moni Devi, was the granddaughter of Bholanath Dey, better known as "Bhola Moira" in the history of nineteenth century Bengal. "Bhola Moira" holds a place in Bengali folklore and culture, not just as a professional confectioner but as an accomplished poet-minstrel. Krishna Chandra was married to Swetangini Devi. They had five sons and one daughter. In 1930, Krishna Chandra started his first shop, "Krishna Chandra Das Confectioner" with his youngest son, Sarada Charan Das.

Contributions and legacy 
Krishna Chandra's major contribution was the introduction of the canned Rosso Golla and the creation of "Rosso Malai" in the year 1930, which became perennial favorites. To market his innovations, Krishna Chandra opened a new confectionery shop at Jora Sanko (in 1930) with his youngest enthusiastic son Sarada Charan Das. From there he popularized the canned Rosso Golla, which was the first and only canned dessert manufactured in India at that time. This was the inception of the "K.C. Das" confectionery company, which was later enhanced and legally reestablished as K.C. Das Private Limited under the Companies’ Act of 1946 by Krishna Chandra's son and successor Sarada Charan Das. Krishna Chandra died within four years of the opening of the company, leaving the affairs of the nascent company in the able hands of Sarada Charan. Today K.C. Das Private Limited is widely acknowledged for their original creations such as "Rosso Golla" and "Rosso Malai".

See also 
Bengali cuisine
K.C. Das Grandsons

References

1869 births
1934 deaths
Bengali culture
Businesspeople from Kolkata
Indian confectionery
Bengali Hindus